Rina Fukushi (Japanese: 福士リナ) (January 27, 1999 in Manila, Philippines) is a Japanese model and singer. She was a member of the girl group Gaia.

Life 
She was born in Manila. She is of half-Japanese and half-Filipino descent, and identifies as being mixed-race (or hafu). She grew up in Tokyo and speaks both Tagalog and Japanese.

She modeled for Miu Miu Marc Jacobs. Louis Vuitton, Alexander Wang, Miuccia Prada. and Bottega Veneta.

Notes

References 

Japanese models
Living people
1999 births